Richard Ferrour (before 1365 – 1402/03), of Wells, Somerset, was an English politician.

He was a Member (MP) of the Parliament of England for Wells in February 1388.

References

14th-century births
1403 deaths
English MPs February 1388
Politicians from Somerset
Year of birth unknown
Place of birth unknown
Year of death unknown